The men's pentathlon P44 event at the 2008 Summer Paralympics took place at the Beijing National Stadium on 11 September. The competition was won by Jeremy Campbell, representing .

Results

Long Jump

Roberto la Barberaita did not participate in the remaining disciplines.

Shot Put

100 metres

Discus Throw

400 metres
Casey Tibbs did not participate.

Final classification

References
Long Jump
Shot Put
100m
Discus Throw
400m

Athletics at the 2008 Summer Paralympics